Proto-Georgian-Zan (also referred to as Proto-Karto-Zan) is a reconstructed language which is the common ancestor of Karto-Zan languages. It had diverged from Proto-Kartvelian during the 19th century BC.

References
 

Agglutinative languages
Kartvelian languages
Georgian-Zan
Georgian-Zan languages